Kristin G. Congdon is an American artist, writer and a Professor Emerita of Philosophy and Humanities at the University of Central Florida.  In her work she focuses on folk art, art education, art history, and feminism. 
She is the founding director of the Cultural Heritage Alliance at the University of Central Florida (UCF), which supports research into folk arts and folk arts education. 
She has written or contributed to over a dozen books on folk arts and is on the Editorial Board of the journal Artizein: Arts and Teaching Journal. She has toured with her art in Florida.

Career 

Congdon received her Ph.D. from the University of Oregon in Art Education. She has contributed to several books and publications. She contributed several essays about Día de los Muertos to the book Of Corpse: Death and Humor in Folklore and Popular Culture by Peter Narvaez. Congdon co-wrote the book Happy Clouds, Happy Trees about Bob Ross, which was reviewed favorably by the Washington Post. Congdon contributed to the book Cassadaga: The South's Oldest Spiritualist Community. She has spoken and written about feminism in art education and other topics related to women in art.

Congdon and Tina Bucuvalas spent five years creating a traveling exhibition which is based on the book Just Above the Water: Florida Folk Art and toured with it in museums all over Florida, including at the St. Petersburg Museum of History.

Congdon is a Professor Emerita at the University of Central Florida.

Published works 
 Art in a Democracy (1987, Teachers College Press, co-editor and contributor)
 Pluralistic Approaches to Art Criticism (1992, Bowling Green University, co-editor and contributor)
 Women Art Educators III (1993, co-editor)
 Evaluating Art Education Programs in Community Centers (1998, co-editor)
 Remembering Others: Making Invisible Histories of Art Education Visible (2000, co-editor)
 Histories of Community-based Art Education (2001, co-editor)
 Uncle Monday and Other Florida Tales (2001, University Press of Mississippi)
 Artist from Latin American Cultures: A Biographical Dictionary (2002, Greenwood Press, with Kara Kelley Hallmark)
 Of Corpse: Death and Humor in Folklore and Popular Culture (2003, contributor)
 Community Art in Action (2004, Davis Publications)
 Just above the Water: Florida Folk Art (2006, University Press of Mississippi, with Tina Bucuvalas)
 American Folk Art: A Regional Reference (2012, ABC-CLIO, with Kara Kelley Hallmark, 2 volumes)
 Happy Clouds, Happy Trees (2016, with Doug Blandy and Danny Coeyman)

Awards and honors 
 National Art Education Association, Manual Barkan Memorial Award (1988 and 1989) for best scholarly contribution to the field of art education
 American Folklore Society, Dorothy Howard Folklore and Education prize
 National Art Education Association, Researcher of the Year Award

References

University of Central Florida faculty
20th-century American women writers
21st-century American women writers
20th-century American non-fiction writers
21st-century American non-fiction writers
University of Oregon alumni
American women non-fiction writers
American women academics